Emin Toro (born November 10, 1974) is an American lawyer who serves as a judge of the United States Tax Court.

Biography 

Toro was born in Albania, the son of Lavdie and Sali Toro. His father was a director for a furniture manufacturing company and his mother was the artistic director for a puppet theater. While in his teens, he met Dan Burrell, a Royal Palm Beach minister who went to Albania for Christian mission work in an orphanage. Toro was chosen to be the interpreter. After the mission was over, Burrell invited Toro to accompany him to the United States and attend college there.

Toro received a Bachelor of Arts from Palm Beach Atlantic University and a Juris Doctor from the University of North Carolina School of Law, where he was inducted into Order of the Coif and was articles editor for the North Carolina Law Review. After law school, Toro clerked for Judge Karen L. Henderson of the United States Court of Appeals for the District of Columbia Circuit and Associate Justice Clarence Thomas of the Supreme Court of the United States. Toro is a Fellow of the American College of Tax Counsel. He has been a partner at Covington & Burling since 2008.

Tax court service 

On April 10, 2018, President Donald Trump nominated Toro to serve as a Judge of the United States Tax Court. He was nominated to the seat vacated by Judge Joseph Robert Goeke, whose term expired on April 21, 2018. On January 3, 2019, his nomination was returned to the President under Rule XXXI, Paragraph 6 of the United States Senate.

On February 6, 2019, his re-nomination was sent to the Senate. On May 23, 2019, the Senate Finance Committee reported his nomination out of committee by a 28–0 vote. On August 1, 2019, his nomination was confirmed by the Senate by voice vote. He was sworn in on October 18, 2019, for a term ending October 17, 2034.

See also 
 List of law clerks of the Supreme Court of the United States (Seat 10)

References

External links 
 

1974 births
Living people
21st-century American lawyers
21st-century American judges
Albanian emigrants to the United States
Judges of the United States Tax Court
Law clerks of the Supreme Court of the United States
Lawyers from Washington, D.C.
Palm Beach Atlantic University alumni
People associated with Covington & Burling
United States Article I federal judges appointed by Donald Trump
University of North Carolina School of Law alumni